Al-khalal is a village in the Taiz Governorate, Yemen, belonging administratively to Mawiyah District. It has a population of 665 people, according to statistics in 2004.

References

Populated places in Taiz Governorate
Villages in Yemen